The Ohinemaka River is a river of the West Coast Region of New Zealand's South Island. It flows northwest from the slopes of Mount Reynolds, at the western end of the Strachan Range, reaching the Tasman Sea to the southwest of Bruce Bay.

See also
List of rivers of New Zealand

References

Rivers of the West Coast, New Zealand
Rivers of New Zealand
Westland District